Hildegard "Hilde" Krahwinkel Sperling ( née Krahwinkel; 26 March 1908 – 7 March 1981) was a German tennis player who became a dual-citizen after marrying Dane Svend Sperling in December 1933. She won three consecutive singles titles at the French Championships from 1935 to 1937. Krahwinkel Sperling is generally regarded as the second-greatest female German tennis player in history, behind Steffi Graf. Sperling played a counterpunching game, predicated on speed, and wore down opponents. Helen Jacobs once wrote that Sperling was the third-best player she ever played, behind Helen Wills Moody and Suzanne Lenglen.

Career

According to A. Wallis Myers and John Olliff of The Daily Telegraph and the Daily Mail, Sperling was ranked in the world top ten from 1930 through 1939 (no rankings issued from 1940 through 1945), reaching a career high of World No. 2 in those rankings in 1936. But according to Ned Potter of American Lawn Tennis magazine, Sperling was the top ranked player for 1936.

From 1935 through 1937, Sperling won three consecutive singles titles at the French Championships. She is one of only four women in history to do so. The others are Moody (1928–1930), Monica Seles (1990–1992), and Justine Henin (2005–2007).

Sperling's only loss on a clay court from 1935 through 1939 was to Simonne Mathieu at a tournament in Beaulieu, France in 1937. The score was 7–5, 6–1, and the two sets took 2 hours and 45 minutes to play. Two games alone lasted an hour. It was Mathieu's only victory versus Sperling in over 20 career matches.

Sperling twice reached the singles final at Wimbledon but never won the title. In 1931, she lost to her compatriot Cilly Aussem. In 1936, she lost to Jacobs. However, Sperling won the mixed doubles title that year, playing with Gottfried von Cramm.

From 1933 through 1939, Sperling won the singles title at the German Championships six consecutive times (the tournament was not held in 1936 because of the Berlin Olympics). This record stood for five decades until Graf won the tournament nine times (though not more than four consecutively). Sperling also won the singles title at the Italian Championships in 1935 and defeated Moody in a semifinal of the 1938 Queens Club London championships, just before Moody won her eighth Wimbledon singles title. Sperling's last international singles title was at the 1950 Scandinavian Covered Courts Championships in Copenhagen, Denmark when she was 41 years old. Sperling won several championships in Denmark while that country was occupied by Germany during World War II. Sperling never entered the U.S. Championships because of scheduling conflicts with the German Championships.

In recognition of her winning the French Championships three times, being a Wimbledon finalist twice, reaching the semifinals of the French Championships and Wimbledon an additional six times, and being ranked in the top 10 for ten consecutive years, Sperling was inducted into the International Tennis Hall of Fame in 2013.

Grand Slam finals

Singles (3 titles, 2 runners-up)

Doubles (0 titles, 2 runners-up)

Mixed doubles (1 title, 1 runner-up)

Grand Slam singles tournament timeline

See also
List of female tennis players
Grand Slam women's singles champions
Performance timelines for all female tennis players who reached at least one Grand Slam final

Notes

References

External links
 

1908 births
1981 deaths
International Tennis Hall of Fame inductees
Sportspeople from Essen
People from the Rhine Province
German emigrants to Denmark
German female tennis players
French Championships (tennis) champions
Wimbledon champions (pre-Open Era)
Grand Slam (tennis) champions in women's singles
Grand Slam (tennis) champions in mixed doubles
Tennis people from North Rhine-Westphalia
World number 1 ranked female tennis players